Legard may refer to:

Alfred Legard (1878–1939), English soldier and cricketer
Antony Legard (1912–2004), English cricketer
Eddie Legard (born 1935), English cricketer
Sir John Legard, 1st Baronet (1631–1678), English politician
Jonathan Legard (born 1961), English broadcaster
Percy Legard (1906–1980), English soldier and Olympic sportsman

See also:
Legard Baronets